The Nardi FN.333 Riviera, later the SIAI-Marchetti FN.333 Riviera, is an Italian luxury touring amphibious aircraft designed and developed by Fratelli Nardi in the 1950s and produced in small numbers by Savoia-Marchetti during the following decade.

Development
The FN.333 Riviera was originally developed by the Nardi Company at Aeroporto Forlanini, Milan, Italy. The first prototype Riviera was registered I-KISS, and was a three-seat aircraft. This plane made its maiden flight on 4 December 1952, and was to be the only FN.333 powered by a 145 hp Continental fan-cooled engine. Beginning with the second prototype a more powerful engine was used, as well as the addition of a fourth seat. The second prototype made its first flight on 8 December 1954. The Nardi Company lacked the resources to fully develop the Riviera, and as a result the third aircraft did not fly until 14 October 1956. Improved power for this aircraft was provided by a 240 hp Continental O-470-H engine. This aircraft was designated the FN.333S and was to be the basis for series production. Lacking further resources, Nardi sold the manufacturing rights for the Riviera to the much larger SIAI-Marchetti in March 1959. 

This deal resulted in the first series of 10 production Rivieras being manufactured at the SIAI-Marchetti factory in Sesto Calende, Varese near Milano, Italy. The first S.I.A.I.-Marchetti manufactured Riviera was completed in February 1962, and by January 1963 the company had delivered four of the aircraft to customers in the USA. The SIAI-Marchetti version had improved power provided by a 250 hp Continental IO-470-P engine, equipped with fuel injection, and manufactured for a pusher-style aircraft. In 1961 the Riviera became available in the United States, where it was initially sold through the North Star Company of Newark, New Jersey. ServAir Inc. of Detroit sold the Riviera in Detroit, Michigan, and received its first Riviera on 13 July 1962. This aircraft, already complete and ready to fly, was placed in the cargo hold of a ship and transported directly from Italy, arriving in Newark, New Jersey. Excluding this example, most Rivieras were shipped partially assembled, and were then completed at Southwest Airmotive before delivery to their owners. Most of the 26 built by SIAI-Marchetti were sold to customers in the United States, but examples were also sold to Australia, Norway and Sweden. A pure flying boat version, lacking landing gear and designated FN.333W, was planned but never built.

Design
The Riviera is somewhat similar to the famous Republic Seabee of the 1940s. The major difference between the Riviera and the Seabee is the use of a high twin-boom tail arrangement on the Riviera while the Seabee uses a single conventional tail. The Riviera uses a tricycle landing gear, with the nose gear retracting into the nose and concealed behind two small nose gear doors. As a result, forward visibility is somewhat better in the Riviera than in the Seabee when taxiing or taking off on land.
   
The Riviera is powered by a  Continental IO-470-P six-cylinder flat engine mounted above the fuselage in a pusher arrangement. A three-bladed propeller was standard.

Surviving aircraft

Out of an original production run of just 26 aircraft over six years less only half a dozen are believed flyable today.
Riviera #0110 (N95DR) crashed while attempting an emergency landing in Minden, Nevada, USA. According to the Nevada Appeal newspaper dated May 24, 2007, the article "Air Crash victim from Germany" stated the accident occurred on Sunday, May 18, 2007

On October 25, 1968, FN-333, Serial # 007 was destroyed in an accident at Akron Municipal Airport.  The pilot, Perry A. Strohl, Jr. was killed in the incident.  The accident was described as follows:
{{Quote|1968-10-25 Hit a pole after losing engine power during take-off (final approach?) from Akron Municipal Airport, Ohio, at 15:22 hrs. Pilot was killed. Aircraft damage reported as "destroyed". The pilot flew the aircraft without maintenance release or preflight. Fuel selector was on empty tank, other tank had fuel. Pilot, commercial, age 46, 576 total hours, 20 in type. NTSB # CHI69A0045, File No: 3–4330.

Specifications

See also

References

Further reading

 
 
 

Riviera
FN.333
1950s Italian civil utility aircraft
Amphibious aircraft
Single-engined pusher aircraft
Twin-boom aircraft
Aircraft first flown in 1952
High-wing aircraft
Flying boats